Ryszard Brzuzy (2 January 1961 – 9 December 2021) was a Polish trade unionist and politician. A member of the Solidarity Citizens' Committee, he served in the Sejm from 1989 to 1991.

References

1961 births
2021 deaths
People from Bogatynia
Polish Labour Party - August 80 politicians
Members of the Contract Sejm